Kenneth Charles Easton  (1924–8 February 2001) was doctor who worked as a General Practitioner in Catterick. He is known for his work in organising immediate care schemes, increasing the provision of specialist medical help at the scene of accidents.

Education 
Easton studied at the Westminster Hospital Medical School.

Career 
In 1967, Easton set up a Road Accident After Care Scheme (RAACS) in North Riding, Yorkshire. He published some recommendations. This was an important innovation that helped provide a model for immediate care schemes that emerged in the United Kingdom. He was a key figure in establishing the British Association of Immediate Care Schemes in June 1977. He was the first chairman of the organisation.

Personal life 
On 8 February 2001, Easton died.

Awards and honours
Easton was made a member of the Order of Saint John in June 1970.

In 1972, the President of the Royal College of General Practitioners (RCGP) presented him with a Foundation Council award, which is given for special meritorious work in connection with the College.

In the 1974 New Year Honours, he was made an Officer of the Order of the British Empire (OBE).

References

1924 births
2001 deaths
Alumni of Westminster Hospital Medical School
20th-century British medical doctors
British general practitioners
Fellows of the Royal College of General Practitioners
Officers of the Order of the British Empire
Officers of the Order of St John